Nina Simone and Her Friends is an album released by the Bethlehem Records label that compiled songs by jazz singers Nina Simone, Carmen McRae and Chris Connor. All three artists had left the label and signed with other companies by the time Bethlehem released this album. The numbers by Simone - with the exception of her 1959 hit single 'I Loves You, Porgy' were "left overs" from the recording sessions for her debut album Little Girl Blue (1959) and released without her knowledge. The tracks by Chris Connor and Carmen McRae were already issued together this way as Bethlehem's Girlfriends in 1956 accompanied by the debut recording session of Julie London.

Notes on songs 
 "I Loves You, Porgy"had already appeared on Little Girl Blue (1959) and as a single of the same year where it became a Billboard Chart top 20 hit.
 "African Mailman", is an instrumental song by Simone.

Track listing 
Side A
 Nina Simone –	"He's Got the Whole World in His Hands" (Traditional)
 Chris Connor – "Cottage for Sale" (Willard Robison, Larry Conley)
 Carmen McRae – "Old Devil Moon" (Burton Lane, E.Y. Harburg)
 Nina Simone –	"I Loves You, Porgy" (George Gershwin, Ira Gershwin)
 Chris Connor – "Try a Little Tenderness" (Jimmy Campbell, Reg Connelly, Harry M. Woods)
 Carmen McRae – "You Made Me Care" (Chuck Darwin, Paulette Girard)
Side B
 Nina Simone –	"For All We Know" (J. Fred Coots, Sam M. Lewis)
 Chris Connor – "What Is There to Say?" (Vernon Duke, E. Y. Harburg)
 Carmen McRae – "Too Much in Love to Care" (Carmen McRae)
 Nina Simone –	"African Mailman" (Nina Simone)
 Chris Connor – "Good Bye" (Gordon Jenkins)
 Carmen McRae – "Last Time for Love" (Carmen McRae)

Personnel (for tracks by Simone only) 
 Nina Simone - vocals, piano
 Jimmy Bond - bass
 Al "Tootie" Heath - drums

References 

1959 albums
Chris Connor albums
Nina Simone albums
Bethlehem Records albums